Eriostepta is a genus of moths in the family Erebidae. The genus was erected by George Hampson in 1901.

Species
Eriostepta bacchans Schaus, 1905
Eriostepta fulvescens Rothschild, 1909
Eriostepta nigripuncta (Joicey & Talbot, 1918)
Eriostepta roseireta Hampson, 1901
Eriostepta sanguinea (Hampson, 1905)

Former species
Eriostepta albiscripta (Schaus, 1905)

References

External links

Phaegopterina
Moth genera